Hawełka is a Polish-language surname of Czech origin.  The corresponding Czech surname is Havelka. In German language, the same Czech surname was phonetically transliterated as Hawelka.

Hawełka or Hawelka may refer to:

Antoni Hawełka (17 January 1840 – 14 January 1894), Polish merchant and caterer
 (1913–2005) café Hawelka founder and operator, wife of Leopold
Leopold Hawelka (April 11, 1911 – December 29, 2011), Austrian coffee house, Café Hawelka, founder and operator, husband of Josephine

See also
Café Hawelka

References

Polish-language surnames
Surnames of Czech origin